Count Riamo d'Hulst (c.1850–1916) was an Egyptologist and antiquarian of possible German origin.

Biography
Details about his early life are unknown. According to one report, d'Hulst may have been a Prussian officer in the Franco-Prussian War of 1870-71, and a possible deserter. Another account relates that he was the victim of a war wound. The same document, however, falsely describes him as an Austrian.

The first reference of D'Hulst is found in the London Times (1887), where it was reported that he discovered an early Christian cemetery in Alexandria. More information about d'Hulst comes to light during the years 1887 to 1892 when he worked as an officer of the Egypt Exploration Fund, most notably on the excavations at Tel Basta (Bubastis) with the Swiss Egyptologist and biblical scholar, Henri Édouard Naville.

D'Hulst helped the Fund to ship large monuments to museums in England and Europe. A speaker of Arabic, he was also placed in charge of superintending the Arab workmen.

See also
Archibald Henry Sayce
Cairo Geniza and Genizah

Publications
D'Hulst, R., 'The Arab House of Egypt', Royal Institute of British Architects, new ser. 6 (1890), 221-7.
Naville, E., Bubastis (1887-1889), Eighth memoir of the Egypt Exploration Fund, London, 1891 [contains a plan of excavations and a photograph of the head of Rameses by the Count d'Hulst].

Further reading

Jefferson, R. J. W., 'A Genizah Secret: the Count d'Hulst and letters revealing the race to recover the lost leaves of the original Ecclesiasticus', Journal of the History of Collections, 21/1 (2009), 125-142. Pre-print version available as open access online.
Jefferson, R. J. W., 'The Cairo Genizah Unearthed: the excavations conducted by the Count d'Hulst on behalf of the Bodleian Library and their significance for Genizah history' in B. Outhwaite & S. Bhayro (eds), A Sacred Source: Genizah Studies in Honour of Professor Stefan C. Reif (Cambridge Genizah Series; I), Leiden: Brill, 2010, 171-200.
Weny, S. ‘L’Archictecte de l’État Charles Arendt (1825–1910) et la restauration de la chapelle du château d’Esch-sur-Sûre (Luxembourg)’, Hémecht: Zeitschrift für Luxemburger Geschichte Revue d’Histoire Luxemourgeoise 55 (2003), pp. 483–523.
 Sacred Trash: the lost and found world of the Cairo Genizah by Adina Hoffman and Peter Cole
 Sacred treasure--the Cairo genizah: the amazing discoveries of forgotten Jewish history in an Egyptian synagogue attic by Mark Glickman

External links
A Genizah Secret
The Cairo Genizah Unearthed - preprint
Count Riamo d'Hulst Blog

References

German Egyptologists
Year of birth uncertain
1916 deaths